Kacholiya Nada is a small town in Bhopalgarh tehsil, Jodhpur district, Rajasthan. Its PIN code is 342606. It is the location of Banaram Ji Mar Temple & A Govt Primary School  And Apart from that famous religious places 'Bholaram ji ki Devri' and 'Bhuriya Baba ki Tikhi' are also located Near this town and this town comes under Ratkuria Village

References

Villages in Jodhpur district